An alcohol burner or spirit lamp is a piece of laboratory equipment used to produce an open flame. It can be made from brass, glass, stainless steel or aluminium.

Uses
Alcohol burners are preferred for some uses over Bunsen burners for safety purposes, and in laboratories where natural gas is not available. Their flame is limited to approximately 5 centimeters (two inches) in height, with a comparatively lower temperature than the gas flame of the Bunsen burner.

While they do not produce flames as hot as other types of burners, they are sufficiently hot for performing some chemistries, standard microbiology laboratory procedures, and can be used for flame sterilization of other laboratory equipment.

Operation 

Typical fuel is denatured alcohol, methanol, or isopropanol. A cap is used as a snuffer for extinguishing the flame.

See also 
 Bunsen burner
 Heating mantle
 Beverage-can stove
 Portable stove

References

External links

Burners
Laboratory equipment